Land of Widows a 21-minute Indian documentary film directed by Aarti Shrivastava. The film focuses on the unsustainable  working conditions of mine workers in the state of Rajasthan, India. Set in the Bhilwara district of Rajasthan this film captures the exploitation the workers have to go through on a daily basis to work in illegal mines for a ‘dollar a day’. Blending investigative journalism with helplessness and dark humour, the film tells the stories of average sandstone miners victimized by corporate greed and political corruption. It examines how sandstone mining has affected the local communities and also people occupied with this occupation. Despite stone mining’s links to several occupational diseases such as psychoneurosis, silicosis, tuberculosis, asbestosis and asthma, abject poverty keeps driving villagers in many parts of the state to illegal mining. More than 70 men from 60 families have died in the last few years of silicosis caused by inhalation of dust containing free crystalline silica. Their men were all mine workers employed in illegal stone quarries that have mushroomed over the past 10 years across the state thanks to record demand for sandstone, marble and other stones as people across the country built homes, offices and malls.

The film is a hitchhiker’s journey through the labyrinthine universe of Democracy, as it exists in its lowest unit level – the Indian village. It showcases that death has lost its sting in parts of Rajasthan. Out there, they call it, not without a tinge of sarcasm, the land of widows. Penury is more horrible than death. They don’t want to see their children cry loud for a piece of bread. They are aware that mining will take their life one day, but poverty will take no time to take their children away from them.

This village, Sriji Ka Kheda is representative of all neighboring villages and perhaps all mining villages in most parts of India.  Welcome to rural India. Where all they can do is hope for a better tomorrow, where the only shine is the glistening of the tears in their eyes, where life is cheap and death – even cheaper! The stories of struggle and visions of hope open a door to the complex issue that is threatening the future of mine workers and their families.

Reviews
"Treating a major social issue sensitively is an art. A very good attempt by Aarti. I recommend it strongly and definitely give it a thumbs-up." - Abbas Arnaout, Director – Aljazeera International Documentary Film Festival.

"A side effect of a know problem remained unknown until the completion of this documentary. A piece of knowledge and respect." -  Alberto Meroni, Film Director & Author

"This is an eye-opener. It is a must-see documentary if you really want to know what’s going on in the world around you. It has opened my eyes,  and it will open yours." -  Hussein Hemayed, Television Director – Lebnon

"Something you shouldn’t miss" -  Elisa Melzer,  Director – Bollywood & Beyond, Indian Film Festival of Germany

"Interesting and touching documentary that describes a sad reality" - Selvaggia Velo,  Director – River to River Film Festival

Awards and recognitions
Best Documentary Film 10th IDPA Awards for Excellence 2012
Official Nomination 7th Al-Jazeera International Documentary Film Festival Doha 2011
Best Documentary Film 6th CMS Vatavaran Environment and Wildlife Film Festival Delhi 2011
Official Nomination 8th Indian Film Festival Bollywood and Beyond Stuttgart 2011

References

External links
 Engagemedia
 CMS Vatavaran
 Humanity Watchdog Foundation
 RIFF MOVIES ARCHIVE
 Qatar Tribune
 Sun Star

2010 films
Indian short documentary films
2010 short documentary films
Documentary films about mining
Documentary films about human rights
Mining in Rajasthan
Films shot in Rajasthan
Documentary films about poverty
Films directed by Aarti Shrivastava
Bhilwara district
Widowhood in India
2010s English-language films